Endomorphin-1 (EM-1) (amino acid sequence Tyr-Pro-Trp-Phe-NH2) is an endogenous opioid peptide and one of the two endomorphins. It is a high affinity, highly selective agonist of the μ-opioid receptor, and along with endomorphin-2 (EM-2), has been proposed to be the actual endogenous ligand of the μ-receptor. EM-1 produces analgesia in animals and is equipotent with morphine in this regard. The gene encoding for EM-1 has not yet been identified, and it has been suggested that endomorphins could be synthesized by an enzymatic, non-ribosomal mechanism.

By combining N-terminal guadino modifications, a new class of endonmorphin-1 was synthesized, the range of their bioactivities were measured by radioligand binding assay in order to conclude its potency as an opioid.  Endomorphin-1 has high affinity and specificity for opioid receptors for behavioral, physiological and pharmacological assays, it is also a potent analgesic agent which brings effects on cardiovascular, respiratory and gastrointestinal functions as well as in immune system responses. This endogenous opioid peptide can help with neuropathic pain without having the common side effects many neuropathic drugs caused which produces constipation. To make this drug side effect-free, a modification at the N-terminus by 2-aminodecainoic acid is made which in term showed an improve in the drug's metabolic stability along with improving its membrane permeability, while holding its high receptor binding affinity, helping the drug act as a potent agonist

See also 
 β-Endorphin

References 

Mu-opioid receptor agonists
Neuropeptides